Dalamarmarangal is a 2009 Indian Malayalam-language artistic film written and directed by Vijayakrishnan. The film is produced under Film Fantasy and distributed through Movie Bazaar. The film is dubbed into Tamil as Idalkalin Oosai.

Synopsis
The hidden secrets of an attempted murder are revealed through portrayal of circumstances that three different girls pass through in their life. Aswathy, a textile-shop employee, is staying with her bedridden and sick mother. She looks after the family with her meager salary. Kartika is a girl who is much loved by her parents. Her life zooms into a crisis when she discovers the secrets of her father’s profession. The third girl, Rohini, lives in luxury and has tremendously rich parents. But the uneasiness and unhappiness in the family atmosphere saddens her. She elopes with her poor lover. Her father engages hired hoodlums to retrieve her after beating up the lover. She decides to kill herself. Aswathy ‘s mother comes in search of Indusekharan, Rohini’s father. Aswathy is actually an illegitimate daughter of Indusekharan. But Indusekharan decides to have Aswathy murdered. He engages Kartika's father to commit the murder. He approaches Aswathy as the messenger of death.

This is an essay on how three different girls from three different social and economic backdrops try to cope with their life against all odds. Their crisis deepens and becomes more dangerous because of their parents' attitude. The experiences prove that lack of love and affection is the prime reason that made hell out of their lives. Lack of love and affection leads one to violence and to destruction as well. Dalamarmarangal establishes that love is the only antidote to violence.

Cast 
 Vinu Mohan as Praveen
 Sai Kumar as Pratapan
 Limu Shankar as Aneesh
 Indrans as Noolan Damu
 Ineya as Aswathy
 Meghanathan as Indusekharan
 Hari Kumaran Thampi as Raja Sekharan Pillai
 Kochu Preman as Bhaskaran
 Sruthi Lakshmi as Rohini
 Surya Mohan as Kartika
 Sobha Mohan as Parvaty
 KanakaLata as Radha
 Lizzie Jose as Lekshmi

Film festival screenings
 11th Dhaka International Film Festival 2010
 Panjajanyam Film Festival-Chittur 2010
 South Asian Film Festival GOA 2010

References

External links
 Dalamarmarangal at One India.in
 Tamil Dubbed Version at SonyLiv

2009 films
2000s Malayalam-language films
Hyperlink films